The 1976–77 Anglo-Scottish Cup was the second edition of the tournament. It was won by Nottingham Forest, who beat Orient in a two-legged final by 5–1 on aggregate.

English Group

Group A

Group B

Group C

Group D

Scottish Group

1st Round 1st Leg

1st Round 2nd Leg

Quarter-finals 1st Leg

Quarter-finals 2nd Leg 

Ayr United were awarded semi-final place after Newcastle United were disqualified for fielding a weakened team during the first leg.

Semi-finals 1st Leg

Semi-finals 2nd Leg

Final 1st Leg

Final 2nd Leg

Notes and references

1976–77 in English football
1976–77 in Scottish football
England–Scotland relations